The R504 is a Regional Route in South Africa that connects Pudimoe with Bothaville via Amalia, Schweizer-Reneke, Wolmaransstad and Leeudoringstad.

Route
It begins from the N18 in the village of Pudimoe, North West, and runs west-east. The first town it passes through is Amalia. It then reaches Schweizer-Reneke, where it intersects with the R506 / R34. The next town it passes through is Wolmaransstad, where it crosses the R505 and the N12 and is briefly co-signed with both. The next town it passes through is Leeudoringstad, where it meets the R502 at a staggered junction. Crossing the Vaal, it enters the Free State, where it ends in Bothaville (3.5 km north of the town centre) at a four-way intersection with the R30 and the R59.

References 

Regional Routes in the Free State (province)
Regional Routes in North West (South African province)